Zoltán Gál (born 10 December 1940, in Budapest) is a Hungarian politician, who served as Interior Minister for a short time in 1990 before the first parliamentary elections. He was the Speaker of the National Assembly of Hungary between 1994 and 1998. His son is Zoltán J. Gál former spokesman of the Hungarian Socialist Party government.

References

MTI Ki Kicsoda 2006, Magyar Távirati Iroda, Budapest, 2005, 563. old.
Gál Zoltán 1996-os országgyűlési életrajza
Gál Zoltán országgyűlési adatlapja

1940 births
Living people
Politicians from Budapest
Members of the Hungarian Socialist Workers' Party
Hungarian Socialist Party politicians
Speakers of the National Assembly of Hungary
Hungarian Interior Ministers
Members of the National Assembly of Hungary (1990–1994)
Members of the National Assembly of Hungary (1994–1998)
Members of the National Assembly of Hungary (1998–2002)
Members of the National Assembly of Hungary (2002–2006)
Members of the National Assembly of Hungary (2006–2010)